Rabdophaga strobiloides, the willow pinecone gall midge, is a species of gall midge in the family Cecidomyiidae.

The gall resembles a pinecone in shape. It can be found throughout North America.

References

Further reading

 
 

strobiloides
Articles created by Qbugbot
Insects described in 1862

Taxa named by Carl Robert Osten-Sacken
Diptera of North America
Gall-inducing insects